The 2nd Regiment, Royal Canadian Horse Artillery is a regular artillery regiment of the Canadian Army. It is based at CFB Petawawa. It forms part of the 4th Canadian Division's 2 Canadian Mechanized Brigade Group.

Batteries 

 D Battery (howitzer)
 E Battery (howitzer)
 F Battery (surveillance and target acquisition)
 Y Battery (observer)
 Headquarters and Services Battery

History

Korean War 
2 RCHA formed on 7 August 1950 as part of Canadian Army Special Force for United Nations mission in the Korean War. From May 1951 to May 1952, 2 RCHA served in Korea as part of the 25th Canadian Infantry Brigade, 1st Commonwealth Division.

Bosnia 
2 RCHA deployed to Bosnia as part of Operation Palladium as part of the United Nations Protection Force (UNPROFOR).

Afghanistan 
2 RCHA deployed 5 times during the War in Afghanistan from 2003-2010, participating in Operation Medusa, where the regiment shot over 2000 rounds of artillery in about 2 weeks.

Commandants 
The regiment has had the following commandants.

Freedoms 
The regiment has received the Freedom of several locations throughout its history; these include:

  1983: Kingston.
  1987: Cobourg.

References 

Artillery regiments of Canada
Military units and formations established in 1949